The Staples River is a river in Kawartha Lakes in Central Ontario, Canada. It is in the Great Lakes Basin and is a tributary of Balsam Lake.

The river begins at an unnamed confluence of streams, northwest of the community of Grasshill in geographic Eldon Township, and flows northeast to its mouth at the West Bay on Balsam Lake in geographic Fenelon Township, at the summit of the Trent–Severn Waterway.

References

Rivers of Kawartha Lakes